Mooreeffoc, also known as The Mooreeffoc Effect, denotes the queerness of things that have become commonplace, when they are seen suddenly from a new angle.  The coinage is generally attributed to G K Chesterton, although the incident that led to it actually occurred to Charles Dickens. The word was first mentioned by Dickens in his autobiography. In a coffee room he visited regularly, he looked up at the glass window-sign from the inside and saw moor eeffoc. He attributed profound significance to this trivial realization,  and he related it to our ability to gain new perspective on familiar things that have become trite because of time or use.  Chesterton, in his 1906 book Charles Dickens: a Critical Study, commented that Dickens's writing shows this "elvish kind of realism...everywhere".

J. R. R. Tolkien also used the word in the same sense in his essay On Fairy-stories.

See also
Nacirema

References

Terminology